Through the Eyes of Love is the tenth studio album by American jazz and R&B singer Randy Crawford, released in 1992 on Warner Bros. Records.

Critical reception

In a review for AllMusic, Ron Wynn gave Through the Eyes of Love three out of five stars, describing it as a "Nice, highly stylized album", and that it was "expressively sung, if at times overproduced".

Track listing

Production
Tracks 1–10 produced by Michael J. Powell
Track 11 produced by Sadao Watanabe
Track 12 produced by Corrado Rustici

Charts

References

External links
Through the Eyes of Love at Discogs

1992 albums
Randy Crawford albums
Warner Records albums
Albums produced by Michael J. Powell